Silvia Levenson (born 1957, in Buenos Aires, Argentina) is a contemporary artist and political activist working in glass. Originally a graphic artist in her native Argentina whose work, both artistic and political, was in direct conflict with the dictatorship of Jorge Rafael Videla, she found herself and her young family immigrating to Italy in 1980. Glass soon became the new medium in which she could best express her feelings of exile, oppression and personal tragedy.

Biography 
Silvia Levenson was born in Buenos Aires, Argentina in 1957. Born into a time when political and social activism was encouraged, she began protesting on behalf of the Buenos Aires poor as early as 14. By the time she was 16 she was married and before her 20th birthday she was a mother. It was during this time that the political climate in Argentina began to change with the military taking control of the government under Jorge Rafael Videla, the senior commander of the Argentine Army. Between 1976 and 1984 more than 30,000 people disappeared and were later killed, including members of Levenson's own family. At the age of 23 she fled to Italy with her husband and family. It was the tragic events of this time that ultimately influenced and continues to influence Levenson's artistic practice.

Further reading 
 Levenson, Silvia. Silvia Levenson: identidad desaparecida: un percorso tra storia personale e memoria di un paese = a path between personal story and historical memory of a country. Italy : PuntoMarte Editore, 2016.
 Wichert, Geoffrey and Pasini, Francesca. Cenetta intima = table for two: an exhibition, October 22-November 21, 1998, Connection Gallery of Bullseye Glass. Portland, Oregon : Bullseye Glass Co., 1998.
 Centro Arte Contemporanea Cavalese. Silvia Levenson : bambina spinosa. Rovereto, [Italy] : Nicolodi, [2001].

References

External links 
 Artist's website 
 Biography: Silvia Levenson Corning Museum of Glass. Corning Museum of Glass. Retrieved 10 March 2018.

1957 births
Living people
20th-century Argentine women artists
21st-century Argentine women artists
Artists from Buenos Aires
Glass artists
Women glass artists
Recipients of the Rakow Commission